Khlong Wang Chao National Park (Thai คลองวังเจ้า) is a national park in Thailand.

Description
Khlong Wang Chao National Park is situated in the Thanon Thong Chai Mountain Range.
Most of the area consists of complicated mountains lying along the North and South. They are one part of Thanon Thong Chai Mountain Range and there is a plain area in their middle part which looks like two pan basins covering . The important mountain ranges are Yen, Tao Dam, Tat Rup Khai, Mi, Bang Cha Le Mountains, Bang Sung Peak etc.

This park lies in Wang Chao, Mueang Tak districts of Tak Province, Kosamphi Nakhon, Khlong Lan and Mueang Kamphaeng Phet districts of Kamphaeng Phet Province, the West of Thailand.

History
On December 7, 1988, the Minister of Agriculture and Cooperative and parties have surveyed the condition of conservation, forest Khlong Wang Chao and Khlong Suan Mak Forests. They found the fertile and densely teak forest (Tectona grandis) and other features. They would like to conserve the forest, thus, Khlong Wang Chao National Park was gazetted on August 29, 1990 with an area of 466,875 rai ~  as the 63rd park of Thailand.

See also
 List of national parks in Thailand
 List of Protected Areas Regional Offices of Thailand

References

External links
National Park Division

Geography of Tak province
Geography of Kamphaeng Phet province
National parks of Thailand
Tourist attractions in Kamphaeng Phet province
Tourist attractions in Tak province
Protected areas established in 1990
1990 establishments in Thailand